The Thrill of It All Tour was the second concert tour by English singer Sam Smith, in support of their second album The Thrill of It All (2017). It began on 20 March 2018 in Sheffield, England, and concluded on 18 April 2019 in Cape Town, South Africa. In December 2018, Billboard concluded that after 94 shows, Smith grossed $86.1 million and sold 1.07 million tickets on The Thrill of It All Tour. It pushed their career total gross to $102.7 million from 1.4 million tickets sold.

Setlist
 Burning
 One Last Song
 I'm Not The Only One
 Lay Me Down
 I Sing Because I'm Happy (The Georgia Mass Choir cover)
 Omen (Disclosure cover)
 Nirvana
 I've Told You Now
 Writing's On The Wall
 Latch
 Money On My Mind
 Like I Can
 Restart
 Baby, You Make Me Crazy
 Say It First
 Midnight Train
 HIM
 Too Good At Goodbyes
 Palace
 Stay With Me
 Pray

Tour dates

Notes 

The score data is representative of the two shows at Ziggo Dome on 2, 5 May respectively.

References 

2018 concert tours
2019 concert tours
Sam Smith (singer)